The 2006 Fórmula Truck season was the 11th Fórmula Truck season. It began on March 19 at Caruaru and ended on December 10 at Brasília.

Calendar and results
All races were held in Brazil.

References

External links
  

2006 in Brazilian motorsport
2006